Nguyễn Hoàng Đức (born 11 January 1998) is a Vietnamese professional footballer who plays as a midfielder for V.League 1 club Viettel and the Vietnam national team.

Club career
In 2018, Hoàng Đức had scored 9 goals for Viettel in V.League 2 and his team had been the champions of season 2018 and bring Thể Công back to 2019 V.League 1.

In 2020, Hoàng Đức help Viettel the first time won V.League 1.

International career
In 2017, Hoàng Đức and Vietnam U-20 join in 2017 FIFA U-20 World Cup in South Korea but they had eliminated from group stage.

In 2021, Hoàng Đức scored first goal of him for Vietnam national football team in the match vs Malaysia national football team.

In 2022, Hoàng Đức had won his first Vietnamese Golden Ball.

Career statistics

International

International goals

U-23
Scores and results list Vietnam's goal tally first. Only results against national teams were counted

Vietnam
Scores and results list Vietnam's goal tally first. Only results against national teams were counted

Honours
Viettel
V.League 1: 2020
V.League 2: 2018
Vietnam
AFF Championship runners-up: 2022
Vietnam U23/Olympic
Southeast Asian Games: 2019, 2021
Individual
Vietnamese Golden Ball: 2021
AFF Championship Best XI: 2022

References 

1998 births
Living people
Vietnamese footballers
Association football midfielders
Viettel FC players
V.League 1 players
People from Hải Dương province
Vietnam international footballers
Southeast Asian Games medalists in football
Competitors at the 2019 Southeast Asian Games
Southeast Asian Games gold medalists for Vietnam
Competitors at the 2021 Southeast Asian Games